Posin is a surname. Notable people with the surname include:

Arie Posin, Israeli-born American film director and screenwriter 
Daniel Q. Posin (1909–2003), American physicist
Jerry Posin (born 1951), American drummer 
Kathryn Posin (born 1943), American choreographer